Delta Kappa Phi is a professional–social collegiate fraternity established in 1899, and located in the United States. As of 2017 it has one active chapter.

History
Delta Kappa Phi was founded as a professional textile fraternity by six students at the Philadelphia Textile Institute (later Philadelphia University and now Thomas Jefferson University) in 1899. Though its founders initially planned to seek affiliation with a national fraternity, that plan was soon shelved and the organization expanded to other schools, focusing on institutions with textile programs. Its second chapter was chartered in 1902 at the Lowell Technological Institute (now the University of Massachusetts Lowell, or UMass Lowell), and the organization gradually established chapters at New Bedford Institute of Textiles and Technology (now part of UMass Darthmouth), the Rhode Island School of Design, North Carolina State University, and Georgia Tech.

The Fraternity was incorporated in the State of Massachusetts in 1905.

By 1979 the fraternity had contracted to just its UMass Lowell and North Carolina State chapters. However, in 1998 the UMass Dartmouth chapter was reactivated, only to be subsequently shuttered again.

In 1980 Steve Call, a pledge of Delta Kappa Phi at the University of Massachusetts Lowell, died after falling ill as the result of an intense program of hazing-related calisthenics he had been required to perform.

The character of the fraternity has significantly differed from school to school. In spite of its origin as a professional textile engineering fraternity, many of its chapters had evolved to become social fraternities with some characteristics of a professional fraternity. While the existing Lowell chapter is social in nature, the now-dormant chapters at North Carolina State and Georgia Tech had been primarily oriented as professional fraternities.

Even while a social fraternity, Delta Kappa Phi's origin as a professional fraternity make it the oldest textile fraternity in America.

Purpose
The Fraternity's website explains:
The purpose of the fraternity is the promotion and encouragement of a fraternal relationship among its members; the furtherance of social enjoyment among its members; and the advancement of the interests of its members in acquiring a thorough education in engineering, the sciences or the liberal arts.

Chapters
Active chapters noted in bold, inactive chapters noted in italics.

Notable members

 Don Trahan (UMass Dartmouth), professional golfer

See also
 Phi Psi (professional), professional, textile arts and manufacturing engineering
 Professional fraternities and sororities
 Sigma Tau Sigma, honor society, textile engineering

References

Fraternities and sororities in the United States
Student organizations established in 1899
1899 establishments in Pennsylvania
Professional fraternities and sororities in the United States